Felipe Bardi dos Santos (born 8 October 1998 in Americana) is a Brazilian track and field sprinter.

Santos focused on the 200 metres and long jump in his youth career. He placed fourth in the long jump at the 2014 Brazil U18 Championships and improved to runner-up the following year. He reached the podium of both the 100 metres and 200 m at the 2016 Brazilian U20 Championships, which earned him a place on the 4 × 100 metres relay team for Brazil at the 2016 IAAF World U20 Championships. Santos also made his debut at the Brazilian Athletics Championships that year, reaching the 100 m semi-finals.

A run of 10.27 seconds for the 100 m brought him third at the 2017 Brazilian Championships, and he repeated that, placing at the 2017 South American Championships in Athletics for a bronze medal. He also anchored the men's 4 × 100 m relay team to the gold medals, with a team of Flávio Barbosa, Aldemir da Silva Júnior, and Bruno de Barros. He competed sparingly in the 2018 season, with his highlight of the year being fifth place at the 100 m national championship race.

He won the 100 m silver medal at the 2019 South American Championships in Lima. At the 2020 Troféu Brasil de Atletismo he was runner-up to Paulo André de Oliveira in the 100 m and also helped his club, SESI São Paulo, to second place in the relay.

He improved his personal best with 10.10 (+0.8) at Cougar Athletic Stadium (Azusa Pacific University), Azusa, CA on 16 April 2021.

He competed at the 2020 Summer Olympics.

Personal bests
100 m: 10.07 (wind: +0.4 m/s) –  Bragança Paulista, 14 May 2022
100 m: 10.02 (wind: +2.6 m/s) –  Chula Vista, 25 Apr 2021
200 m: 20.44 (wind: 0.0 m/s) –  Azusa, 15 May 2021
60 m: 6.62 –  Cochabamba, 19 Feb 2022

All information from World Athletics profile.

International competitions

See also
List of international medallists in men's 100 metres

References

External links

1998 births
Living people
Sportspeople from São Paulo (state)
Brazilian male sprinters
Troféu Brasil de Atletismo winners
Athletes (track and field) at the 2020 Summer Olympics
Olympic athletes of Brazil
South American Championships in Athletics winners
20th-century Brazilian people
21st-century Brazilian people